Mihailo Cmiljanović (born 15 June 1994) is a Serbian footballer who plays as a left-back, recently for Leotar.

Club career

References

External links
 Futbalnet profile
 

1994 births
Living people
People from Prijepolje
Association football midfielders
Serbian footballers
Serbian expatriate footballers
FK Sloga Kraljevo players
FK Polimlje players
FK Kolubara players
1. FC Tatran Prešov players
1. FK Příbram players
Partizán Bardejov players
Serbian First League players
Slovak Super Liga players
2. Liga (Slovakia) players
Czech First League players
Czech National Football League players
Expatriate footballers in Germany
Serbian expatriate sportspeople in Germany
Expatriate footballers in the Czech Republic
Serbian expatriate sportspeople in the Czech Republic
Expatriate footballers in Slovakia
Serbian expatriate sportspeople in Slovakia